Hyperthagylla is a monotypic moth genus in the subfamily Arctiinae erected by George Hampson in 1900. Its single species, Hyperthagylla mira, was first described by Arthur Gardiner Butler in 1878. It is found in the Amazon region and Costa Rica.

References

Lithosiini
Monotypic moth genera
Moths of Central America
Moths of South America